The Iskut volcanic field is a group of volcanoes and lava flows on and adjacent to the Alaska–British Columbia border in the Boundary Ranges of the Coast Mountains. All the volcanoes in this volcanic field are situated in British Columbia along the Iskut and Unuk rivers and their tributaries, with lava flows having reached Alaska. The oldest volcanoes in the Iskut volcanic field are Little Bear Mountain and Hoodoo Mountain, which are 146,000 and 85,000 years old, respectively. Younger volcanic centres include Second Canyon, King Creek, Tom MacKay Creek, Snippaker Creek, Iskut Canyon, Cone Glacier, Cinder Mountain and Lava Fork, all of which formed in the last 70,000 years. All of the volcanoes are mafic in composition except for Hoodoo Mountain which consists of peralkaline rocks. The latest volcanic eruption took place from the Lava Fork volcano in 1800, although an uncertain 1904 eruption is also attributed to this volcano.

The name Iskut-Unuk River Cones is a nearly synonymous term for this volcanic field but it omits Hoodoo Mountain and Little Bear Mountain, the oldest volcanoes comprising the Iskut volcanic field.  The name for this area in the Tlingit language is Séxkhulé, referring to the time of Aan Galakhú (the World Flood) when people took refuge here from the rising flood waters.

See also
List of Northern Cordilleran volcanoes
List of volcanoes in Canada
Volcanism of Western Canada

References

External links
 Catalogue of Canadian volcanoes: Iskut River
 Alaska Volcano Observatory: Iskut-Unuk River Cones

Volcanic fields of Canada
Boundary Ranges
Stikine Country
Northern Cordilleran Volcanic Province